Helicopter Maritime Strike Squadron Seven One (HSM-71) is a United States Navy helicopter squadron based at Naval Air Station North Island, San Diego, California. Nicknamed the "Raptors", they are attached to Carrier Air Wing Nine (CVW-9) and deploy with the strike group centred on the aircraft carrier  .  The squadron was formed on October 4, 2007 and was the first fleet squadron to receive the MH-60R Seahawk.
It received its first Battle "E" in 2009, and was also awarded the Captain Arnold Jay Isbell Trophy for superior air antisubmarine warfare (ASW) in 2009 and again in 2010.

See also
 History of the United States Navy
 List of United States Navy aircraft squadrons

References

External links
 HSM-71's official website

Helicopter maritime strike squadrons of the United States Navy
Military units and formations in California